Głuszyca  is a town in Wałbrzych County, Lower Silesian Voivodeship, in south-western Poland. As of 2019, the town has a population of 6,361. It is the seat of the administrative district (gmina) called Gmina Głuszyca, close to the Czech border. It is located within the historic region of Lower Silesia.

History

The settlement was mentioned as Wustendorf in the Liber fundationis episcopatus Vratislaviensis from around 1300 as a village owned by the Bishopric of Wrocław. It was founded in the late 13th century during the reign of Duke Bolko I the Strict of the Piast dynasty, named Neu-Gerhardisdorf ("Gerhard's new village") as a German settlement within the Holy Roman Empire.

After the town was devastated in the wake of the Hussite Wars, the town was resettled by miners from Saxony. Along with the region belonging to the Austria, it was ceded to the Kingdom of Prussia in the 18th century, and til 1945 it was also part of Germany. During World War II, the Germans created several forced labour camps in the village, subject to the Gross-Rosen concentration camp. Thousands of people, women and men were imprisoned there. After Germany's defeat in World War II in 1945, the town was part of the region that became part of Poland under the terms of the Potsdam Agreement.
   
The local textile factories were heavily devastated because of their use by Germany for armaments production. In 1946 production started thanks to specialists from Łódź, and soon Głuszyca became one of the leading centers of the cotton industry in the region. Głuszyca was granted town rights in 1962.

Transport
There is a train station in the town.

Sports
The local football club is Włókniarz Głuszyca. It competes in the lower leagues.

References

Cities and towns in Lower Silesian Voivodeship
Wałbrzych County
Cities in Silesia